Paul Bruce Corkum  (born October 30, 1943) is a Canadian physicist specializing in attosecond physics and laser science. He holds a joint University of Ottawa–NRC chair in Attosecond Photonics. He is one of the students of strong field atomic physics, i.e. atoms and plasmas in super-intense laser fields.

Biography and research
Corkum was born in Saint John, New Brunswick. He obtained his BSc (1965) from Acadia University, Nova Scotia, and his MSc (1967) and PhD (1972) in theoretical physics from Lehigh University, Pennsylvania. He won several awards for his work on laser science.

Corkum is both a theorist and an experimentalist. In the 1980s he developed a model of the ionization of atoms (i.e. plasma production) and on this basis proposed a new approach to making X-ray lasers (Optical field Ionization, OFI). OFI lasers are today one of the most important developments in X-ray laser research.

In the early 1990s in strong field atomic physics there were discoveries of high harmonic generation and correlated double ionization (in which an atom can absorb hundreds of photons and emit two electrons). Corkum's Recollision Electron Model served as the basis for the generation of attosecond pulses from lasers. With this method in 2001 Corkum with colleagues in Vienna succeeded in demonstrating for the first time laser pulse lengths lasting less than 1 femtosecond. The method was used for the generation of higher harmonics and (as a type of laser tunneling microscope) for exploration of atoms and molecules in the angstrom range and below.

Corkum's recollision electron physics has led to many advances in understanding the interactions among coherent electrons, coherent light, and coherent atoms or molecules. The recollision electron can be thought of as an electron interferometer built by laser light generated from atoms or molecules. As an interferometer, the recollision electron can be used to measure atomic and molecular orbitals by means of interfering waves from the bound electrons and the recollision electrons.

From 1997 to 2009, he was the adjunct professor of physics at McMaster University.

In 2018, Corkum was the first Canadian to be awarded the Isaac Newton Medal by the Institute of Physics for his outstanding contributions to experimental physics and to attosecond science and for pioneering work which has led to the first-ever experimental image of a molecular orbital and the first-ever space–time image of an attosecond pulse. Attosecond techniques can freeze the motion of electrons within atoms and molecules, observe quantum mechanical orbitals, and follow chemical reactions.

Awards
2022 BBVA Foundation Frontiers of Knowledge Award in Basic Sciences
2022 Wolf Prize in Physics
2019 The Willis E. Lamb Award for Laser Science and Quantum Optics
2018 SPIE Gold Medal
2018 Institute of Physics Isaac Newton Medal
2017 Royal Medal
2015 Lomonosov Gold Medal
2013 Harvey Prize
2013 Royal Photographic Society Progress medal and Honorary Fellowship awarded in recognition of any invention, research, publication or other contribution which has resulted in an important advance in the scientific or technological development of photography or imaging in the widest sense []
 2013 King Faisal International Prize for Physics (King Faisal Foundation).
 2009 Gerhard Herzberg Canada Gold Medal for Science and Engineering (NSERC)
 2008 John C. Polanyi Award (NSERC)
 2006 Arthur L. Schawlow Prize in Laser Science (American Physical Society)
 2006 Killam Prize (Canada Council for the Arts)
 2005 Charles Hard Townes Award (Optical Society of America)
 2005 Quantum Electronics Award (IEEE)
 2005 Fellow of the Royal Society
 2003 Queen Elizabeth II Golden Jubilee Medal
 2003 Tory Medal (Royal Society of Canada)
 1999 Einstein Award (Society for Optical and Quantum Electronics)
 1996 Gold Medal for Lifetime Achievement in Physics (Canadian Association of Physicists)

Membership
Femtosecond Science Group at the Steacie Institute for Molecular Sciences (Founder)
NRC Atomic, Molecular and Optical Science Group (Program Leader)
Order of Canada (Officer).
Order of Ontario
Royal Society of London (Member)
Royal Society of Canada (Member)
US National Academy of Sciences (Member)

Selected works
 
 with N. H. Burnett, M. Y. Ivanov: 
 with H. Niikura, F. Legaré, R. Hasbani, M. Ivanov, D. Villeneuve: 
 with Ferenc Krausz: 
 with Chandrasekhar Joshi: 
with Donna Strickland:

References

External links
Attosecond Science Seminar by Paul Corkum
Video: Paul Corkum (Nat'l Research Council of Canada), Attosecond Science

1943 births
Living people
Acadia University alumni
Canadian Fellows of the Royal Society
Canadian physicists
Fellows of the American Physical Society
Fellows of the Royal Society of Canada
Foreign associates of the National Academy of Sciences
Foreign Members of the Russian Academy of Sciences
Lehigh University alumni
Members of the Order of Ontario
Officers of the Order of Canada
People from Saint John, New Brunswick
Recipients of the Lomonosov Gold Medal
Academic staff of the University of Ottawa